Terry Slater is an honorary senior research fellow in Historical Geography at the University of Birmingham, UK. Born in Bromley but raised in Charlton he was educated at Hull University, University College, London and the University of Birmingham.

He joined the University of Birmingham as a lecturer in 1971 and continued until retirement. He devoted a lot of his spare time to the Church of England in Birmingham that led to him being made an honorary Lay Canon of St Philip's Cathedral, Birmingham in 2005.

Research interests 
Slater's research interests include:

 English medieval town planning
 Town-plan analysis
 Medieval towns and the Church
 European medieval urban development
 North American urban development
 Urban conservation
 Historic Towns Atlases
 Early Industrial Towns
 Faith in the City

Publications 
 1980 The making of the Scottish countryside (edited with M L Parry) (Croom Helm, London)
 1982 Field and forest: an historical geography of Warwickshire and Worcestershire (edited with P J Jarvis) (Geo Books, Norwich)
 1990 The built form of western cities: essays for M R G Conzen on the occasion of his 80th birthday (University Press, Leicester)
 1996 Managing a Conurbation: Birmingham and its Region (edited with A. J. Gerrard) (Brewin Books, Studley)
 1997 A History of Warwickshire (Phillimore, Chichester) (2nd revised edition)
 1998 The Church in the Medieval Town (edited with G. Rosser) (Ashgate, Aldershot) 307 pp
 2000 Urban Decline 100-1600 (ed.) (Ashgate, ALdershot) 325pp
 2002 Edgbaston Past (Phillimore, Chichester)
 2005 A Centenary History of the Diocese of Birmingham (Phillimore, Chichester)
 2007 A County of Small Towns: The Development of Hertfordshire's Urban Landscape to 1800 (University of Hertfordshire Press, Hatfield)
 2016  The Pride of the Place. The Cathedral Church of St Philip, Birmingham, 1715-2015 (Privately Published, Birmingham)

References

External links 
 Dr. Slater's University Page

Living people
Alumni of the University of Hull
British geographers
English Anglicans
Academics of the University of Birmingham
Alumni of the University of Birmingham
Historical geographers
Year of birth missing (living people)